Gaseopsan is a mountain located in Chungju, North Chungcheong Province, South Korea.

See also
Geography of Korea
List of mountains in Korea
List of mountains by elevation
Mountain portal
South Korea portal

References

Chungju
Mountains of North Chungcheong Province
Mountains of South Korea